Nancy Springer (born July 5, 1948) is an American author of fantasy, young adult literature, mystery, and science fiction. Her novel Larque on the Wing won the Tiptree Award in 1994. She also received the Edgar Award from the Mystery Writers of America for her novels Toughing It in 1995 and Looking for Jamie Bridger in 1996. Additionally, she received the Carolyn W. Field Award from the Pennsylvania Library Association in 1999 for her novel I am Mordred. She has written more than fifty books over a career that has spanned nearly four decades.

She released her first Enola Holmes book in 2006 and followed by 7 sequels in the series. Her other series include The Book of the Isle fantasy series and the Tales of Rowan Hood. The Enola Holmes Mysteries was adapted in 2020 as the Netflix film Enola Holmes and a 2022 sequel Enola Holmes 2.

Life and career
Nancy Springer was born in Montclair, New Jersey to Harry E. and Helen Connor, moving to Gettysburg, Pennsylvania with her family when she was thirteen. 

As a child, she read a lot about King Arthur and his Round Table and Robin Hood and had often read and reread Sherlock Holmes. She was raised to "speak grammatically" and is well versed with Victorian literature. Her parents were born in 1906 and 1909. Her two older brothers had left the family for college by the time she hit puberty. Her mother was a professional artist, who painted oil portraits of pets. Springer was 14 when her mother's health began to deteriorate due to cancer, menopause and an early-onset form of Alzheimer's. Her parents had purchased a motel, which she helped work. 

She remained in Pennsylvania for forty-six years, raising two children, Jonathan Paul (born in 1974) and Nora Lynn (born in 1978), by her first husband Joel Springer, a minister and fine art photographer. They were divorced in 1996. She met her second husband, Jaime Fernando Pinto, in 1999, while she was working in a no-kill animal shelter. In 2007, they moved to Bonifay, Florida, in a secluded part of the Florida panhandle, a place conducive to her hobbies of birdwatching, horseback riding and fishing, and his love of aviation.

Works

Collections
 Chance and Other Gestures of the Hand of Fate (1985)
 Stardark Songs (1993)

Series

The Book of the Isle
 The White Hart (1979)
 The Book of Suns (1977) expanded as The Silver Sun (1980)
 The Sable Moon (1981)
 The Black Beast (1982)
 The Golden Swan (1983)

Sea King
 Madbond (1987)
 Mindbond (1987)
 Godbond (1988)

Tales of Rowan Hood
 Rowan Hood: Outlaw Girl of Sherwood Forest (2001)
 Lionclaw (2002)
 Outlaw Princess of Sherwood (2003)
 Wild Boy (2004)
 Rowan Hood Returns (2005)

The Enola Holmes Mysteries
 The Case of the Missing Marquess (2006)
 The Case of the Left-Handed Lady (2007)
 The Case of the Bizarre Bouquets (2008)
 The Case of the Peculiar Pink Fan (2008)
 The Case of the Cryptic Crinoline (2009)
 The  Case of the Gypsy Goodbye (2010) also published with the title The Case of the Disappearing Duchess
 Enola Holmes and the Black Barouche (2021)
 Enola Holmes and the Elegant Escapade (2022)

Other novels
 Wings of Flame (1985)
 Chains of Gold (1986)
 A Horse to Love (1987)
 The Hex Witch of Seldom (1988)
 Not on a White Horse (1988)
 Apocalypse (1989)
 They're All Named Wildfire (1989)
 Red Wizard (1990)
 Colt (1991)
 Damnbanna (1992)
 The Friendship Song (1992)
 The Great Pony Hassle (1993)
 Toughing It (1994)
 The Blind God is Watching (1994)
 Larque on the Wing (1994)
 The Boy on a Black Horse (1994)
 Metal Angel (1994)
 Looking for Jamie Bridger (1996)
 Fair Peril (1996)
 Secret Star (1997)
 I Am Mordred (1998)
 Sky Rider (1999)
 Plumage (2000)
 Separate Sisters (2001)
 I am Morgan le Fay (2001)
 Needy Creek (2001)
 Blood Trail (2003)
 Dusssie (2007)
 Somebody (2009)
 Possessing Jessie (2010)
 Dark Lie (2012)
 My Sister’s Stalker (2012)
 Drawn into Darkness (2013)
 The Oddling Prince (2018)
 Grandghost (2018)

Awards and nominations

 Mythopoeic Fantasy Award for Adult Literature Best Novel nominee (1982): The Sable Moon
 World Fantasy Best Short Story nominee (1987): "The Boy Who Plaited Manes"
 Hugo Best Short Story nominee (1987): "The Boy Who Plaited Manes"
 Nebula Best Short Story nominee (1987): "The Boy Who Plaited Manes"
 Tiptree Award (1995): Larque on the Wing
 Edgar Award for Best Young Adult Mystery (1995): Toughing It
 Edgar Award for Best Juvenile Mystery (1996): Looking for Jamie Bridger
 Mythopoeic Fantasy Award for Adult Literature Best Novel nominee (1997): Fair Peril
 Carolyn W. Field Award (1999): I am Mordred
 Edgar Award for Best Juvenile Mystery nominee (2007): The Case of the Missing Marquess: An Enola Holmes Mystery
 Edgar Award for Best Juvenile Mystery nominee (2010): The Case of the Cryptic Crinoline: An Enola Holmes Mystery

References

External links

 

Nancy Springer Papers at Gettysburg College
 
Nancy Springer's Facebook page

1948 births
20th-century American novelists
21st-century American novelists
20th-century American women writers
21st-century American women writers
American science fiction writers
American mystery writers
American fantasy writers
American women novelists
American young adult novelists
Edgar Award winners
Living people
Magic realism writers
People from Montclair, New Jersey
Novelists from New Jersey
Women mystery writers
Women science fiction and fantasy writers
Women writers of young adult literature
Writers of modern Arthurian fiction